Craigantlet Hillclimb, a speed event organised by the Ulster Automobile Club, was first held in 1913. It is the only such venue in Northern Ireland to host a round (latterly two rounds) of the British Hill Climb Championship, which started in 1947.

The current course is 1,460 yards (1335 metres) in length, and unlike hillclimbs in the rest of the UK is laid out on closed public roads. Sections of the course are named for past winners, in order of ascent: Howe, Hall, Hadley, Mays Cross, Allard, Wharton Straight, Pringle.

Tragedy struck at Craigantlet in 1995 when Mark Colton was killed in practice for the event. The meeting was abandoned.

The hill record currently stands at 39.63 seconds, set by Scott Moran on 2 August 2008, driving a Gould GR61.

Craigantlet Hillclimb past winners

Key: R = Course Record; FTD = Fastest Time of the Day.

Footnotes

External links
 Ulster Automobile Club
 Top 12 Run Off 

Hillclimbs
Motorsport venues in Northern Ireland
Sports venues in County Down